The Tualatin Park & Ride is a transit center located in the Oregon city of Tualatin, served by the Portland metropolitan transit agency TriMet. It is located adjacent to the Bridgeport Village shopping center.

Current service 
In addition to TriMet service, service south to Wilsonville is provided by SMART transit.

The following bus lines serve this location:

 36-South Shore
 37-Lake Grove
 38-Boones Ferry Road
 76-Beaverton/Tualatin
 96-Tualatin/I-5
 SMART Route 2X: Tualatin Park & Ride

References 

Tualatin, Oregon
TriMet